Janbazan Metro Station is a station in Tehran Metro Line 2. It is located in the junction of Resalat Expressway and Ayatollah Madani Avenue. It is between Sarsabz Metro Station and Fadak Metro Station.

The station has two elevators and six escalators.

The station was called Golbarg until 2017 when it was renamed to Janbazan.

References

Tehran Metro stations